Barry Rubinow (born 1956) is a film executive and editor, born in Glen Rock, New Jersey, a suburb of New York City.  Currently, he lives in West Hills, Los Angeles, California.

Education
Rubinow received his Bachelor of Arts from Bucknell University with a major in English and Psychology in 1978.  In 1981, he completed a Master of Fine Arts at the School of Cinematic Arts at the University of Southern California.

Career
Rubinow is the Senior Vice President of Documentary Channel, where he supervises all original production and post production. DOC is the first channel in the United States to show documentaries on a full-time basis.  The Documentary Channel was created in 1998 and is currently on the Dish Network, Channel 197.

Rubinow is also a television and documentary film editor.

In 1999, Rubinow produced and directed the 35mm feature film The Set Effect.

Filmography (producing and directing)
Feature film
 The Set Effect (1999)

Documentaries (producing)
 Hot Docs (2006)

Filmography (editing)
Short documentaries
 Red Grooms: Sunflower in a Hothouse (1986)
 Louise Dahl-Wolfe: Painting with Light (1999)
 Herb Alpert: Music for Your Eyes (2003)

Feature documentaries
 Country Music: The Spirit of America (IMAX, 2003) aka, Our Country
 Chances: The Women of Magdalene (2006)

Television documentaries
 Frederic Remington: The Truth of Other Days (PBS, 1991)
 Beatrice Wood: Mama of Dada (PBS, 1994)
 America's Music: The Roots of Country (TBS 1996)

Television series
 Beakman's World (1993)
 COPS (1993–1994)
 Ultimate 10 (1999)
 The Eddie Files (1997–2000)
 Born American (2003)
 Doc Talk (2006)
 Hot Docs (2006)

Awards
Wins
 Academy of Television Arts & Sciences: Emmy Award, Beakman's World, editing, 1995

References

External links
 
 

1956 births
American documentary filmmakers
Living people
People from Glen Rock, New Jersey
USC School of Cinematic Arts alumni
Date of birth missing (living people)
Bucknell University alumni
People from West Hills, Los Angeles